Mount Pedersen is a mountain, 2,070 m, standing 9 nautical miles (17 km) southeast of Galatos Peak in Salamander Range, Freyberg Mountains. Mapped by United States Geological Survey (USGS) from surveys and U.S. Navy air photos, 1960–64. Named by Advisory Committee on Antarctic Names (US-ACAN) for John M. Pedersen, biologist at McMurdo Station, summers 1965–66 and 1966–67.

Mountains of Victoria Land
Pennell Coast